Frank Anger (September 24, 1939 – July 8, 2004) was an American fencer. He competed in the individual and team épée events at the 1964 Summer Olympics.

See also
List of Princeton University Olympians

References

External links
 

1939 births
2004 deaths
American male épée fencers
Olympic fencers of the United States
Fencers at the 1964 Summer Olympics
Fencers at the 1963 Pan American Games
Fencers at the 1967 Pan American Games
Medalists at the 1963 Pan American Games
Medalists at the 1967 Pan American Games
Pan American Games gold medalists for the United States
Pan American Games silver medalists for the United States
Pan American Games medalists in fencing
20th-century American people
21st-century American people